The 1983 Cal Poly Mustangs football team represented California Polytechnic State University during the 1983 NCAA Division II football season.

Cal Poly competed in the Western Football Conference (WFC). With Cal Poly Pomona dropping football at the end of the 1982 season, the WFC was down to four schools in 1983. The Mustangs were led by second-year head coach Jim Sanderson and played home games at Mustang Stadium in San Luis Obispo, California. They finished the season with a record of five wins and six losses (5–6, 1–2 WFC). Overall, the team was outscored by its opponents 248–249 for the season.

Schedule

Team players in the NFL
The following Cal Poly Mustang players were selected in the 1984 NFL Draft.

Notes

References

Cal Poly
Cal Poly Mustangs football seasons
Cal Poly Mustangs football